Alfred Young may refer to:

Alfred Young (mathematician) (1873–1940), British mathematician
Alfred Young (artist) (born 1936), English conceptual and visual artist
Alfred F. Young (1925–2012), American historian
Alfred Karney Young (1864–1942), British barrister, judge, and cricketer
Alf Young (1905–1977), football manager and footballer for Huddersfield Town
Alf Young (footballer, born 1900) (1900–1975), English footballer  of the 1920s
Al Young (dragster driver) (born 1946), American former drag racer

See also

Al Young (disambiguation)